Almucs de Castelnau or Castelnou (c. 1140 – pre-1184) was a trobairitz (a female troubadour) from a town near Avignon in Provence. Her name is also spelled Almuc, Amucs, Almois, Almurs, or Almirs.

Almucs' only surviving work is a poetic exchange with Iseut de Capio, another trobairitz. The song is presented in the chansonniers intermixed with a long razo. It tells how Iseut begged Almucs de Castelnau to pardon Gigo (Gui), lord of Tournon (Tornon) in the Vivarais, Iseut's knight, who had committed "a great fault" against Almucs. Gigo, however, neither repented nor sought forgiveness, and so Almucs responded to Iseut in a cobla of her own. This exchange has been dated to around 1190. Almucs is also mentioned (...dompna nal murs...) in the poem Ia de chan by fellow trobairitz Castelloza.

Identification

Almodis de Caseneuve
Almucs may be identified with a certain Almodis of Caseneuve, which is not far from Avignon and near Les Chapelins, possibly the home of Iseut de Capio. Chronologically, Almodis and Almucs would have been contemporaries and the lords of Caseneuve have documented relationships with other troubadours. Almodis was the second wife of Guiraut I de Simiane, who also ruled Apt and Gordes. She gave birth to four sons, including Raimbout d'Agould, the second eldest, who, in 1173, accompanied his father on Crusade. Since Raimbout must have been of sufficient age at the time to undergo a long and arduous journey and Guiraut's first wife had died in 1151, the marriage of Almodis must be placed between that date and approximately 1161 (assuming that the eldest son would have to have been at least twelve at the time of the Crusade). Bogin suggests that a widower like Guiraut would have quickly remarried and that Almodis was therefore probably not born much later than 1140.

If the Guiraut de Simiane mentioned in documents of 1113 and 1120 is the same as Almodis' husband, it is probable that he went on Crusade with the hope of dying in the East. In 1150 Guiraut witnessed the will of Tibors de Sarenom, the mother of Raimbaut d'Aurenga. In 1184 Raimbout d'Agould made a donation to the Abbey of Sénanque in the name of his parents, who were presumably dead. Raimbout is subsequently mentioned frequently by Gaucelm Faidit as N'Agout.

Wife of Guigo de Randon
It is possible that Almucs was the wife of Guigo de Castelnou de Randon, who flourished around 1200.

Sources

Bogin, Meg (1976). The Women Troubadours. Scarborough: Paddington. . 
Bruckner, Matilda Tomaryn; Shepard, Laurie; and White, Sarah (1995). Songs of the Women Troubadours. New York: Garland Publishing. . 

1140s births
People from Provence
12th-century French women writers
12th-century French troubadours
Trobairitz
12th-century deaths
French women poets